Various organisations commissioned opinion polls for the 2017 New Zealand general election during the term of the 51st New Zealand Parliament (2014–2017). Roy Morgan Research polled monthly, with MediaWorks New Zealand (3 News/Newshub Reid Research) and Television New Zealand (One News Colmar Brunton) polling less frequently. The last The New Zealand Herald (Herald Digipoll) was in December 2015, and Fairfax Media (Fairfax Media Ipsos) discontinued their poll after the 2014 election. The sample size, margin of error and confidence interval of each poll varied by organisation and date, but were typically 800–1000 participants with a margin of error of just over 3%.

The previous Parliament was elected on Saturday 20 September 2014. The 2017 general election was held on Saturday 23 September 2017.

Party vote and key events
Refusals are generally excluded from the party vote percentages, while question wording and the treatment of "don't know" responses and those not intending to vote may vary between survey organisations.

Graphical summary
The first graph below shows trend lines averaged across all polls for parties that received 5.0% or more of the party vote at the 2014 election. The second graph shows parties that received between 1.0% and 4.9% of the party vote or won an electorate seat at the 2014 election.

Individual polls

Internal polls
These polls are typically unpublished and are used internally for Labour (UMR) and National (Curia). Although these polls are sometimes leaked or partially leaked, their details are not publicly available for viewing and scrutinising. Because not all of their polls are made public, it is likely that those which are released are cherry-picked and therefore may not truly indicate ongoing trends.

Preferred Prime Minister

Graphical summary

Individual polls

Electorate polling

Ōhāriu

Party vote

* The Opportunities Party did not exist until 2016.

Candidate vote

* The Opportunities Party did not exist until 2016.

Waiariki

Party vote

Candidate vote

The Māori roll (all 7 electorates)

* The Opportunities Party did not exist until 2016.

Whangarei

Party vote

* The Opportunities Party did not exist until 2016.

Candidate vote

Ikaroa-Rāwhiti

Party vote

Candidate vote

Te Tai Hauāuru

Party vote

Candidate vote

Te Tai Tonga

Party vote

Candidate vote

Hauraki-Waikato

Party vote

Candidate vote

Tāmaki Makaurau

Party vote

Candidate vote

Te Tai Tokerau

Party vote

Candidate vote

Forecasts

New Zealand does not have a strong tradition of third-party forecast models. Some private individuals have created their own projection models.

See also
 Opinion polling for the 2020 New Zealand general election
 Opinion polling for the 2014 New Zealand general election
 Politics of New Zealand

Notes

References

 
2017 New Zealand general election